

Lothar Berger (31 December 1900 – 5 November 1971) was a German general (Generalmajor) in the Wehrmacht during World War II who commanded the 75th Infantry Division. He was a recipient of the Knight's Cross of the Iron Cross with Oak Leaves. Berger initially surrendered to the Soviet forces in May 1945, but was transferred to British custody and was released in 1946.

Awards and decorations
 Iron Cross (1914) 2nd Class (28 July 1918) & 1st Class (24 September 1920)
 Clasp to the Iron Cross (1939) 2nd Class (30 September 1939) & 1st Class (2 October 1939)
 Knight's Cross of the Iron Cross with Oak Leaves
 Knight's Cross on 5 August 1940 as Major and commander of III. / Infanterie-Regiment 84
 806th Oak Leaves on 28 March 1945 as Oberst and commander of Brigade z.b.V.100 / XXXX.Panzer-Korps

References

Citations

Bibliography

 
 
 

1900 births
1971 deaths
People from Halberstadt
Major generals of the German Army (Wehrmacht)
German Army personnel of World War I
Recipients of the clasp to the Iron Cross, 1st class
Recipients of the Knight's Cross of the Iron Cross with Oak Leaves
German prisoners of war in World War II held by the Soviet Union
German prisoners of war in World War II held by the United Kingdom
People from the Province of Saxony
Military personnel from Saxony-Anhalt